Taylor Hagler (born October 4, 1995) is an American racing driver who currently competes for Bryan Herta Autosport in the TCR class of the Michelin Pilot Challenge.

Career

Early career
Hagler developed an interest in motorsports at a young age, attending NASCAR races with her father at just six years old. At 19, she began attending the Skip Barber Racing School with an unused voucher gifted to her sister, before embarking upon national-level racing competitions in 2018 after graduating from the University of Texas at San Antonio. However, much of her sporting endeavors in her younger years were spent participating in show jumping.

Touring and sports car racing
In 2018, Hagler began competing in the NASA Texas Spec Miata Championship, taking fifth overall and rookie of the year honors in her first season of competition. The following season, she began a full-season campaign in the TC America Series, competing in the TCA class with X-Factor Racing. Taking two class podiums, at Circuit of the Americas and Watkins Glen, Hagler finished fifth in the TCA classification. She also undertook several part-time drives, making a one-off appearance at the 24H of COTA and appearing several times in the NASA Texas Spec Miata Championship, winning twice.

2020 saw Hagler make her debut in IMSA competition, joining LA Honda World Racing for the full season alongside co-driver Ryan Eversley. She appeared in nine of the ten races run that season, missing the round at Sebring after testing positive for COVID-19. Claiming a lone podium at Mid-Ohio, Hagler finished 9th in the TCR-class drivers' championship. 

2021 would see Hagler take on full-time rides in both the Michelin Pilot Challenge and GT World Challenge America. In the former, she joined Bryan Herta Autosport, driving alongside Michael Lewis in the team's lone Hyundai Veloster N TCR entry. In the latter, she joined fellow HPD GT3 Academy graduates Dakota Dickerson and Jacob Abel, who shared the role of Hagler's co-driver throughout the season. Hagler and Lewis' Michelin Pilot Challenge campaign was incredibly successful, with the duo claiming a class victory at Lime Rock Park and six class podiums en route to winning the TCR class title, over 200 points clear of second-placed Parker Chase. In the process, she became the first female champion in series history. Her GT World Challenge America campaign yielded three class victories and eight class podiums as she finished runner-up in the Pro-Am class to Jan Heylen and Fred Poordad.

For 2022, Hagler continued competing with Bryan Herta Autosport, this time behind the wheel of the Hyundai Elantra N TCR. Paired with Lewis once again, the team focused on consistent finishes as opposed to race victories, tallying seven podiums but only one race victory over the course of the ten race season. Following a podium finish in the final round at Road Atlanta, Hagler claimed her second consecutive TCR-class championship. Alongside her Michelin Pilot Challenge campaign, Hagler also competed in the Indianapolis 8 Hours for RealTime Racing, joining Michael Cooper and Erin Vogel.

Hagler's 2023 program saw her return to the Michelin Pilot Challenge, with Lewis as her co-driver for the third consecutive season. She was also included in Hyundai North America's lineup for the 2023 Nürburgring 24 Hours, where she'd make her debut alongside fellow factory drivers Lewis, Mason Filippi, and Harry Gottsacker.

Personal life
Outside of motorsports, Hagler works full-time as an administrative assistant.

Racing record

Career summary

References

External links
Taylor Hagler at IMSA

1995 births
Living people
American racing drivers
24H Series drivers
GT World Challenge America drivers
Bryan Herta Autosport drivers
Michelin Pilot Challenge drivers
Racing drivers from San Antonio
Racing drivers from Texas
Sportspeople from San Antonio